The following is a list of Law & Order episodes from the series' seventh season (1996–1997): During the 7th season, Law & Order was becoming more popular than ever on television and was NBC's 2nd most-popular drama; however, the ratings were usually half the size of the network's hit drama ER. NBC decided to give Law & Order some additional promotion by airing episodes 149 "D-Girl", 150 "Turnaround" & 151 "Showtime" (a three-episode story arc involving the murder of a Hollywood director's wife, partially set in Los Angeles) on Thursday nights at 10pm ET instead of ER reruns.  Ratings for all three episodes were strong and helped establish the show on NBC's schedule for years to come. Episode 152 "Mad Dog" was supposed to air on a Thursday night as well, but NBC moved Law & Order back to Wednesdays at 10pm ET when their midseason show, the police drama Prince Street, bombed in the ratings in that same time slot. Law & Order won the Emmy for Outstanding Drama Series for their work in the 7th season.

Cast
Jamie Ross (played by Carey Lowell) replaced season 6's Claire Kincaid  (Jill Hennessy) in the role of Assistant District Attorney.  The resulting ensemble cast was the most stable in the history of the Law & Order series up to this point, remaining unchanged for two seasons and 47 episodes.

Main cast
 Jerry Orbach as Senior Detective Lennie Briscoe
 Benjamin Bratt as Junior Detective Rey Curtis
 S. Epatha Merkerson as Lieutenant Anita Van Buren
 Sam Waterston as Executive Assistant District Attorney Jack McCoy
 Carey Lowell as Assistant District Attorney Jamie Ross
 Steven Hill as District Attorney Adam Schiff

Recurring cast
 Carolyn McCormick as Dr. Elizabeth Olivet

Episodes

References

External links
 Episode guide from NBC.com

07
1996 American television seasons
1997 American television seasons